Kelci Bryant (born January 15, 1989) is an American diver. She competes in the 3 m synchronized springboard event. Bryant competed in the 2008 Summer Olympics in Beijing, China, placing fourth with Ariel Rittenhouse, and won a silver medal in the 2012 Summer Olympics in London, England with partner Abigail Johnston. She is a two-time NCAA champion and dove at the University of Minnesota. She was born in Springfield, Illinois.

References

External links 
 Kelci Bryant biography from NBC Olympics site

Divers at the 2008 Summer Olympics
Divers at the 2012 Summer Olympics
1989 births
Living people
American female divers
Olympic silver medalists for the United States in diving
Sportspeople from Springfield, Illinois
Medalists at the 2012 Summer Olympics
Pan American Games medalists in diving
Pan American Games silver medalists for the United States
Pan American Games bronze medalists for the United States
Universiade medalists in diving
Divers at the 2007 Pan American Games
Universiade silver medalists for the United States
Medalists at the 2011 Summer Universiade
Medalists at the 2007 Pan American Games
21st-century American women